The 2nd Kansas Colored Infantry Regiment was an infantry regiment that served in the Union Army during the American Civil War.

Service
The 2nd Kansas Infantry (Colored) was organized at Fort Scott, Kansas, and mustered in for three years. It mustered in by individual companies beginning in August 1863 at Fort Scott and completed muster-in at Fort Smith, Arkansas, on November 1, 1863, under the command of Colonel Samuel Johnson Crawford.

The regiment was attached to District of the Frontier, Department of Missouri, to January 1864. Unattached, District of the Frontier, VII Corps, Department of Arkansas, to March 1864. 2nd Brigade, District of the Frontier, VII Corps, to December 1864.

The 2nd Kansas Infantry (Colored) was redesignated as the 83rd U.S. Colored Troops (U.S.C.T.) on December 13, 1864.

Detailed service
Action at Baxter Springs, Kansas, October 6, 1863 (Company A). Moved from Fort Scott, Kansas, to Fort Smith, Arkansas, October 19, 1863, as escort to train. Duty at Fort Smith until March 1864. Steele's Expedition to Camden March 23-April 30. Prairie D'Ann April 9–13. Jenkins' Ferry April 30, and May 4 and 8. Return to Fort Smith and duty there until December.

Casualties
The regiment lost at least 71 men during service; one officer and 70 enlisted men killed or mortally wounded. The numbers are incomplete because the regiment's records were lost after the action at Jenkins' Ferry.

Commanders
 Colonel Samuel Johnson Crawford

Notable members
 Captain Alexander Rush, Company H - Namesake of Rush County, Kansas, killed at the Battle of Jenkins' Ferry, on April 30, 1864

See also

 List of Kansas Civil War Units
 List of United States Colored Troops Civil War units
 Kansas in the Civil War

References

 Dyer, Frederick H. A Compendium of the War of the Rebellion (Des Moines, IA: Dyer Pub. Co.), 1908.
 Official Military History of Kansas Regiments During the War for the Suppression of the Great Rebellion (Leavenworth: W. S. Burke), 1870.
Attribution

External links
 History of the 2nd Kansas Infantry (Colored) by the Museum of the Kansas National Guard

Military units and formations established in 1863
Military units and formations disestablished in 1864
Units and formations of the Union Army from Kansas
Kansas Infantry, 002
1863 establishments in Kansas